Michel Bussi (born ) is a French author, known for writing thriller novels, and a political analyst and Professor of Geography at the University of Rouen, where he leads a Public Scientific and Technical Research Establishment ("UMR") in the French National Centre for Scientific Research ("CNRS"), where he is a specialist in electoral geography.

According to the Le Figaro/GfK list of bestsellers, Bussi was the second bestselling French author of 2018, selling 975,800 copies. He has appeared in the annual top 10 since 2013.

Biography
Bussi was born on 29 April 1965 in Louviers, Eure.

Bussi usually publishes a book a year, but they can take several years to become popular. For example, Mourir sur Seine (2008) and Nymphéas Noirs (2011) had only modest initial success, but paperwork editions, serialisations and above all his most popular work Un avion Sans Elle have propelled him into the limelight.

Most of his novels are set in Normandy.

In 2013, Bussi was eighth in the Le Figaro/GfK list of bestsellers

Career

In the early 1990s he wrote his first novel, a thriller set around the Normandy landings, which was rejected by several publishing houses. He then wrote short stories, but they too were rejected. Ten years later, inspired by a trip to Rome at the peak of popularity of Dan Brown's The Da Vinci Code and after reading Arsène Lupin by Maurice Leblanc, Bussi returned to Rouen with his IGN papers and resumed work on his manuscript until in 2006, as Code Lupin, it found an academic publisher, Éditions des Falaises.  The first manuscript was reworked nine times.

Bussi's first novel, Code Lupin, sold more than  copies, and in 2010 was serialised over thirty days by the Paris Normandie daily newspaper.

In 2008, his third novel,  ("Death on the Seine"), was published to coincide with the Rouen Regatta. It sold several thousand copies within weeks. It won the Basse-Normandie Regional Committee Prize (Queen Mathilde Prize).

In 2009, his fourth novel,  ("Family blood"), aimed at both an adult and teenage audience, was published.

The same year, he changed publishers to Presses de la Cité. His novel  ("Black Waterlilies"), a cloak-and-dagger thriller set in Giverny, the home of Claude Monet, was published on 20 January 2011. It was critically praised and became a best seller, winning the Readers' Award at the Cognac Thriller Festival, the Mediterranean Thriller Prize at the Villeneuve-lès-Avignon Festival, and the Michel Lebrun Grand Prize of the 25th hour of Le Mans, the Readers' Priye at Sang d'Encre of Vienne, and the Gustave Flaubert Grand Prize of the Norman Writers' Guild, becoming the best-selling French detective novel of 2011. It was issued in paperback on 5 September 2013.

In January 2012, his novel Un avion sans elle ("After the Crash"), his first work to be set outside of Normandy, was published by Presses de la Cité. The critic Gérald Collard called it the thriller of the year. In its first year of publication it was awarded the Maison de la Presse award, the Popular Novel Award and Best French-language Detective Novel (at Montigny-Les-Cormeilles). Within months of release, it had sold 500,000 copies in France and has since sold over one million copies. It has been sold in translation in 34 countries worldwide including Spain, Germany, Italy, Russia, Poland, Bulgaria, Hungary, Japan, Korea, Lithuania, Portugal, Taiwan, United Kingdom, Israel, Brazil, Czech Republic, Slovakia, Norway, Greece, Turkey, Netherlands, Vietnam, Latvia, Romania and Serbia. From September 2013, it was serialised daily in l'Est Républicain for over 200 days. A four episode TV adaptation will be broadcast in 2019 on M6.

In March 2013, La Cité published Michel Bussi's seventh novel,  ("Don't Let Go of My Hand"). The novel takes place on the tropical island of Réunion and revolves around a woman who disappears from her hotel room. Her husband, suspected of her murder, runs away with their daughter, and is pursued by the police. The novel was a finalist for the 2012 Relay Travellers' Award for May 2012, a finalist for the Grand Prix for Detective Fiction and won the 2013 Island Novel Award. In 2014, it was released in paperback by Pocket. A TV adaptation for TF1 is in production. In 2013, Bussi was the eighth bestselling French author, selling 478,800 books.

In May 2014, La Cité published his eighth novel, N'oublier jamais ("Never forget"). In 2014, Bussi was the fifth bestselling French author, selling 843,000 books.

In 2015, his novel Maman a tort ("Mother is Wrong") was published. In May 2018, a 6 episode TV adaptation was broadcast on France 2. In 2015, Bussi was the third bestselling French author, selling over 1 million books.

In 2016, Bussi was the second bestselling French author, selling 1,135,300 books. In 2017, he was the third bestselling French author, selling 931,000 books. In 2018, he was the second bestselling French author, selling 975,800 books.

Bibliography 

Novellas in collections
2010 — "T'en souviens-tu mon Anaïs?" in Les Couleurs de l'instant
2015 — "L'Armoire normande" in Quatre auteurs à la plage
2016 — "La Seconde Morte, in 13 à table!

Non-fiction books

Awards

Omaha Crimes 
 2007:  ("Blood Writing Prize"), Vienne, Isère
 2008:  ("Literary Prize for First Detective Novel"), Lens, Pas-de-Calais
 2008:  ("Academic Writing Prize"), Caen
 2008: , Trévières
 2008,  Writers Prize, Le Havre

Mourir sur Seine 
 2008:  (Queen Mathilde Prize)

Nymphéas noirs 
 2011: Readers' Thriller Prize, Cognac Festival
 2011: Mediterranean Thriller prize (Villeneuve-lès-Avignon Festival)
 2011: Michel-Lebrun Prize at the 25th Hour of Le Mans
 2011: Gustave Flaubert Grand Prize, Norman Writers' Guild
 2011: Writers' Prize at the Festival Sang d'Encre, Vienne, Isère
 2011: Critics' Prize for Mystery (3rd place)
 2011: French Thriller Prize at Montigny-lès-Cormeilles (2nd place)
 2011: Marseilles Thriller Prize
 2011: Cognac Thriller Prize
 2011: Popular Novel Prize at Elven, Morbihan
 2011: Prix Plume-Libre
 2011: Crystal Pen Prize at the Detective Novel Festival at Liège.
 2014: "critiques-libres.com" Prize (14,000-member literature website)
 2015: Prix Domitys (Prix des Maisons de Retraite)

Un avion sans elle 
 2012: Prix Maison de la Presse ("Publishers' Award")
 2012: Prix du polar francophone, Montigny-lès-Cormeilles
 2012: Prix du roman populaire, Elven, Morbihan
 2012: Prix "à chacun son histoire" ("Everyone has a story"), Estaimpuis, Belgium
 2012: Grand Prix de littérature policière (finalist)
 2012: Prix Polar de Cognac (finalist)
 2013: NVN Reader's Prize, le Noir du Val Noir, Vaugneray
 2014: Prix Dupuy (lycée Dupuy de Lôme)

Ne lâche pas ma main 
 2013: Book of the Month, May, Europe 1/Relay Travellers' Prize 
 2013: Prix du roman insulaire, salon du livre insulaire d'Ouessant, "Crime" category
 2013: Prix des lecteurs "Voyage au cœur du polar", bibliothèque de Mesnil-Esnard.
 2013: Grand Prix de littérature policière (finalist)
 2013: Prix Interpol'art (finalist)
 2013: Prix Polar de Cognac (finalist)
 2014: Pays de Pouzauges Literary Prize
 2014: Murderer's Pen Prize  Martres-Tolosane

References

External links
 

21st-century French novelists
French crime fiction writers
Thriller writers
Living people
1965 births
Writers from Normandy
People from Louviers
French male novelists
Prix Maison de la Presse winners
21st-century French male writers